Arbach is a river of Bavaria, Germany. It is a right tributary of the Swabian Rezat near Pleinfeld in the Middle Franconian district Weißenburg-Gunzenhausen.

To the north-east of the wood field sector Totenleite, it is fed on its right side by the Arbachgraben, which is coming from the north from Kreisstraße WUG 16 .

See also
List of rivers of Bavaria

Rivers of Bavaria
Weißenburg-Gunzenhausen
Rivers of Germany